KPPT-FM (100.7 FM) is a radio station broadcasting a classic hits format. Licensed to Depoe Bay, Oregon, United States, the station is currently owned by Jeff Montgomery, through licensee PACNW Broadcasting, LLC.

History
The station went on the air as KCEL at 107.1 FM. On 1986-01-01 the station changed its call sign to KTDO-FM, on 1990-07-02 to KZUS (and moved from 107.1 FM to 100.7 FM), on 1992-02-10 to KZUS-FM, on 1997-10-10 to the current KPPT-FM.

On October 1, 2020, KPPT-FM rebranded as "100.7 The Otter", shifting from 1960s-70s to 1970s to 1980s hits.

Previous logo

References

External links

PPT-FM
Lincoln County, Oregon
1980 establishments in Oregon
Classic hits radio stations in the United States